Julia Galloway is a potter who creates utilitarian work, and is a professor and Director of the School of Art at the University of Montana-Missoula.

History 
Julia Galloway was raised in Boston, Massachusetts and received her MFA at the University of Colorado at Boulder, and BFA at the New York State College of Ceramics at Alfred University.

Work Found In 
Her work has been published in Ceramics Monthly, Studio Potter, Art and Perception and Clay Times. She also is in "The Ceramic Spectrum" by Robin Hopper, "The Art of Contemporary Pottery" by Kevin Hulch, Craft in America: Celebrating Two Centuries of Artist and Objects, and The Ceramic Continuum, Archie Bray Foundation. Julia's work is included in the collections of the Renwick Gallery, Smithsonian Museum, Washington DC, The Huntington Museum of Art, Huntington, WV, Archie Bray Foundation, Helena, MT, The Clay Art Center, Port Chester, NY, The Art Gallery of Nova Scotia, Halifax, Nova Scotia, Canada, and the University of Arkansas, Fayetteville.

Intention 
Galloway's work is intended to be functional, yet also beautiful. To Galloway, beauty is as valid as function, and she delights in making pottery that is “joyous to use and decorates” our living spaces with “character and elegance.” The objects are meant to be appreciated both through vision and touch; to be lived with and valued for their tactile nature as much as their visual appeal. While they initially appear to be simple and familiar, they are noted by other artists to be very complex.

Most notable about Galloway's forms has been her nesting of vessels within baskets and trays. Joining forms together, she presents them as pairs, groups or stacks.
Her pairs are mirrors of each other or nestling bedmates, sometimes slightly awkward, but well matched. Her cream and sugar “beds,” reference the domestic. Some of her creamers rest on pillowy mattresses, while others stand tall on top of smaller partners. The trays and baskets are slab-constructed with raw grogged stoneware, which plays against the colorful, smoothly-glazed porcellaneous stonewares they contain. Having containers within containers and not bases or sconces, locates the work within the sphere of the decorative, in the domain of “display.” Their role is to protect, situate and define a place for the object to operate – they tell us where they belong. Like a painting within a frame, these frame the pots, reinforcing their meaning within the realm of function.

Influenced by Minoan ceramics, Sung and Tang dynasty court ware, as well as Persian miniature paintings, her work references human form and domestic architecture with form, and recalls floral patterning and organic decoration.

Work description 
Most of her objects are made by combining wheel-thrown and handbuilt elements “to expose the sculptural nature of pottery, and the seductive nature of porcelain.” She primarily fires her objects in a kiln, for its skin surface qualities and allowing for layering of decoration.

Her work, typically ranging between 4-20 inches in length and 6–18 in height, appear much smaller and more intimate than their images in photographs would have you believe. Their nature is contained architectural spaces is which explode, with forms within forms, thus condensing their quiet power. Yet the work isn't quiet and understated. On the contrary, their forms are somewhat “exaggerated, their surface bold, colorful, complex, and often, challenging.”

Many of her pieces border on erotic with their folds, curves, and bulges, and touch is reemphasized and reinforced by lush, juicy, drippy and wet glazes.

References 

Year of birth missing (living people)
Living people
New York State College of Ceramics alumni
American potters
University of Colorado alumni
University of Montana faculty
American women ceramists
American ceramists
Artists from Boston
21st-century American artists
21st-century American women artists
Women potters
21st-century ceramists
American women academics